Ronshausen is a municipality and a Luftkurort (“air spa”) in Hersfeld-Rotenburg district in northeastern Hesse, Germany.

Geography

Location
The community lies in the valley of the Ulfe, which in Bebra empties into the Fulda. It lies in the Seulingswald and the Richelsdorf Hills (ranges).

The nearest major towns are Bad Hersfeld (some 15 km to the southwest), Rotenburg (some 12 km to the northwest) and Eisenach (some 35 km to the east).

Neighbouring communities
Ronshausen borders in the northwest on the town of Bebra (outlying centre of Weiterode), in the northeast on the community of Nentershausen, in the east on the community of Wildeck, in the south Friedewald and in the west on the community of Ludwigsau (all in Hersfeld-Rotenburg).

Constituent communities
Ronshausen has only one outlying Ortsteil, Machtlos.

History
In 1061, Ronshausen had its first documentary mention as Runteshuson in a donation document to the Fulda Abbey. The outlying centre of Machtlos had its first documentary mention as villa Mechtolves in 1329. The name Mechtolves meant “the mighty wolf”

From 1359, a toll station was set up at Ronshausen, which exacted road tolls for the Ulfestraße (road) until 1834. As early as 1386, Ronshausen belonged to the Landgraves of Hesse.

In the Thirty Years' War from 1618 to 1648 and the Seven Years' War from 1756 to 1763, the community was abandoned several times, but already by 1780, there was a mention of Ronshausen as a big village of 468 inhabitants.

Until the mid 19th century, the community was characterized by agricultural pursuits. Only when the Bebra-Eisenach railway was built did this change. Tourism has played a rôle since the mid 20th century.

The community of Machtlos was amalgamated with Ronshausen in 1972 as part of municipal reform.

Politics

Community council

The municipal election held on 26 March 2006 yielded the following results:

The community's executive (Gemeindevorstand) is made up of five members, with four seats allotted to the SPD and one to the CDU.

Mayor
Mayor Friedhold Zilch (SPD) was once again elected on 30 October 2005 with 62.7% of the vote.

Town partnerships
 Genas, Rhône, France since 1976
 Frauensee, Thuringia since 1990

Culture and sightseeing

Buildings
 800-year-old fortress church with rustic Baroque paintings

Culinary specialities
At a local butcher shop is made a local speciality called the Januar-Stracke, a kind of aged pork sausage.

Economy and infrastructure

Transport
Ronshausen has a railway station on the Thüringer Bahn from Eisenach to Bebra.

References

External links
  
 

Hersfeld-Rotenburg